Savageau is a surname. Notable people with the surname include:

Cheryl Savageau (born 1950), Native American poet
Michael Antonio Savageau (born 1940), American engineer